Afak Stadium (Arabic: ملعب عفك) is a multi-use stadium in Al Diwaniyah, Iraq. It is currently used mostly for football matches and serves as the home stadium of Afak FC and Al-Diwaniya FC. The stadium holds 5,000 people.

The stadium was inaugurated on 27 May 2016 with a football game between Al Diwaniyah's local team and Iraqi league stars' team which ended 2–2. All benefits from the entrance tickets were given to the poorest families of the city and also to the families whose members sacrificed themselves to protect their homeland during the last Iraq war.

See also 
List of football stadiums in Iraq

References

Football venues in Iraq
Athletics (track and field) venues in Iraq
Multi-purpose stadiums in Iraq
2016 establishments in Iraq
Sports venues completed in 2016